Rico Roman (born February 4, 1981) is an American gold medal ice sled hockey player and Purple Heart recipient from Portland, Oregon who competed in 2014 Winter Paralympics in Sochi, Russia.

Early life
Roman, who is of Mexican American descent, graduated from Alpha High School in 2000 and joined United States Army soon after. His left leg got amputated after he hit an Improvised explosive device while serving in the Iraq War in February 2007. After the injury, one of the Operation Comfort personnel have suggested him to join the San Antonio Rampage sledge hockey club where he later played from 2009 to 2011 seasons.

Career
In 2012 he joined Dallas Stars which he helped by winning the USA Hockey Sled Classic Division A Championship. From 2011 until now he serves on the United States National Sled Hockey Team and was a winner of the 2013 USA Hockey Sled Cup. In November 2011 he became a silver medal recipient at the IPC World Sledge Hockey Challenge and next year won gold at the same place, following by another silver in 2013. In 2012 he was awarded with a gold medal by winning the International Paralympic Committee Ice Sledge Hockey World Championship and next year won a silver one at the same place. Prior to sled hockey he was quoted saying:
They asked me to come out and play sled hockey, and I was like, I don't come from a hockey state. I'm from Oregon. We don't play hockey there. How many Hispanics do you see playing hockey? In 2014 he got another gold medal, this time at Sochi Paralympics.

References

External links

 
 

1981 births
Living people
Sportspeople with limb difference
American sledge hockey players
Paralympic gold medalists for the United States
Ice sledge hockey players at the 2014 Winter Paralympics
Medalists at the 2014 Winter Paralympics
Medalists at the 2022 Winter Paralympics
Sportspeople from Portland, Oregon
American sportspeople of Mexican descent
Paralympic medalists in sledge hockey
Paralympic sledge hockey players of the United States
United States Army personnel of the Iraq War
United States Army soldiers